Ten Sing is a Christian youth program within YWCA and YMCA, engaging teenagers in creative performing arts.

Activities, goals and values

Ten Sing work is based on a common agreement between member countries of the European Ten Sing Group – The Ten Sing Idea:

Abstract

Ten Sing is a YMCA international Youth programme and YWCA (Young Women's Christian Association), which focuses on getting young people to express themselves by using their own culture through creative performing arts.

The main aims

The underlying objectives are leadership training, democracy training and personal and social development of body, mind and spirit. Ten Sing invites young people to a creative work process that uses different cultural expressions in a Christian context.

The five C's

The five C's "Culture, Creativity, Care, Competence and Christ" are equally important parts of the Ten Sing idea.

By young people, for young people.

Young people know best what young people think, dream of, feel and desire. Therefore, young people should be active in the management of Ten Sing and take responsibility for running programmes themselves.

Young responsibility, adult presence''
Ten Sing is for young people, with young people and run by young people. Even though the young people are responsible for the programme, it is important to have adult presence. Adults should act as mentors for the youth leaders. The adults should be a resource for help, support and advice when needed.The whole human beingEverybody has talents that can be used in Ten Sing, and everyone should get the chance to be creative and active with his or her own mind and body, thus stimulating their spirit. This happens through a great variety of performing arts, such as music, dance, drama, video and other creative expressions. The Ten Sing programme focuses on "the whole human being", with spirit, mind and body.Process before productTo reach the goal of developing young people, Ten Sing focuses on the process of making a creative performance. The process is the tool to make everybody contribute. Therefore, the young people should develop both social and creative skills.

This is why the process itself is the key: Letting the young people work together regularly in a safe environment, trying and failing, challenging each other, developing and growing, whilst creating a product that the young people can enjoy and be proud of. This enables them to reflect and value their achievements and skills gained through the process.Open membership, Christian leadership'''

Ten Sing is open to everyone irrespective of gender, beliefs, abilities, talents, ethnic and social background. It is not necessary to be a Christian to be a member of Ten Sing. Nevertheless, to secure the Christian context of Ten Sing it's important that at least one of the key leaders is a Christian.

Origin
Ten Sing originated from Norway in 1968. The name "Ten Sing" is a combination of the Norwegian suffix "-ten" (en. "-teen") and the English word "sing" – a kind of language mixing that was quite common in Norway at the time.

The first Ten Sing group was started in Bergen by Kjell Grønner. It was inspired by Sing Out, which later became known as Up with People. The years that followed more groups were formed in Norway, and today there are over hundred groups all over Norway. The Norwegian YWCA–YMCA wanted to implement Ten Sing in other European countries, and the starting point was Germany in 1986. This was the start of Ten Sing Norwegen, now Ten Sing Norway. The name has no relation to Tenzing Norgay.

The first European Ten Sing Conference was held in 1987.

Key events in the European Ten Sing Group (ETS)

 1993: Germany (Dobelmühle)
 1995: Norway (Haugesund)
 1997: Hungary (Kiskörös)
 1999: Czech Republic (Litomysl)
 2003: YMCA Festival Czech Republic (Prague)
 2006: Denmark (Århus)
 2008: YMCA Festival Czech Republic (Prague)
 2011: Germany (Ziegenhain)
 2013: YMCA Festival Czech Republic (Prague)
 2018: Celebrating 50 years of Ten Sing, Norway
 Annual European Ten Sing Group Conference (location varies)

Ten Sing Norway

Ten Sing Norway is a one-year leader training program within YMCA/YWCA of Norway. During the year the participants visit YMCA and YWCA – festivals, Ten Sing groups, youth clubs and groups within YMCA/YWCA in both Norway and Europe. When on tour, Ten Sing Norway is holding seminars, shows, concerts and Ten Sing rehearsals. The participants live at Rønningen Folk High School in Oslo, and study Bible studies and Christian Youth Work at the University of Oslo.

Sources

 Høgne, Guro (1998): Ten Sings betydning for musikalsk og personlig utvikling: et casestudie av et Ten Sing-kor (en. The significance of Ten Sing for musical and personal development: A case study of a Ten Sing choir). Master Thesis, Oslo University.
 Ulstein, Jan Ove (red.): Ten Sing Norway International Inc.: perspektiv på ti års prosjektliv. (en. Ten Sing Norway International inc.: perspective on ten years project life). Report. Volda University College.
 Ten Sing Norway Homepage
 Description of the Ten Sing Norway Curriculum

External links
===International sites===
 Ten Sing Resource File, by Africa Alliance of YMCA's
 European Ten Sing Programme Group (ETS)

National sites
 Ten Sing in Belarus
 Ten Sing in Czech Republic
Ten Sing in Denmark
 Ten Sing in England
 Ten Sing in Germany
 Ten Sing in Norway
 Ten Sing in Switzerland
 Ten Sing in Ukraine
 Ten Sing in Poland

References

Youth choirs
Youth empowerment organizations
Christian youth organizations
YMCA
Performing arts education